Aldanellidae is an extinct family of paleozoic molluscs that have been assigned to the Gastropod stem group but may also belong to a paraphyletic "Monoplacophora".

Occurrence
In the upper Nemakit-Daldyninan, and possibly earlier in Mongolia.

Systematics
The taxonomy of the Gastropoda by Bouchet & Rocroi, 2005 categorizes Aldanellidae in the superfamilia Pelagielloidea within the 
Paleozoic molluscs of uncertain systematic position. This family has no subfamilies.

According to the P. Yu. Parkhaev, is the Pelagiellidae the family in the order Pelagiellifomes MacKinnon, 1985 within the subclass Archaeobranchia Parkhaev, 2001 in the class Helcionelloida Peel, 1991.

Genera 
Genera in the family Aldanellidae include:
 Aldanella Vostokova, 1962 – type genus of the family Aldanellidae

References 

Helcionelloida
Taxa named by Earle Gorton Linsley